Discover Barbados Television also known as The Visitor Channel, is available in a number of hotels around the island. The Discover Barbados Channel caters to tourists coming to Barbados and brings programming to some of the most notable places of interest to visit, cultural shows, and other aspects of Barbados' history and culture.

Overview
The channel is available at most hotels around the island. The channel also hosts weekly contests where visitors can win prizes including return trips to the island. Tourists wanting to see the channel can enquire at the hotel front desk if the channel is available at the hotel where they are staying or view it online.

Below are a few of the hotels where the Visitor Channel is available:
The Mango Bay Hotel
The Sandridge Beach Hotel
The Casuarina Beach Hotel
Sea Foam Haciendas
The Bougainvillea Hotel
Blue Horizon Hotel
The Golden Sands Beach Apartments
Almond Beach Hotel
Silver Sands Hotel
Escape Hotel
Royal Pavilion Hotel
Port St. Charles
Tamarind Cove
Accra Beach Hotel
Crane Beach Hotel
Southern Palms Hotel

See also
 Communications in Barbados
 List of television stations in the Caribbean

References

External links
 
 

Television channels and stations established in 1999
Television stations in Barbados
Travel television
1999 establishments in Barbados